In philosophy, the Canberra Plan is a contemporary program of methodology and analysis that answers questions about what the world is like according to physics. It is considered a naturalistic approach in metaphysics, which holds that metaphysics can explain the features of the world described by physics and what the different classes of everyday belief represent. A more detailed description of the plan refers to it as a family of doctrines that are grounded on a physicalist worldview as well as a priori philosophizing to explain our thoughts about our world as revealed by physics.

The Canberra Plan arose in the 1990s at the Australian National University in Canberra, Australia. Its originators were David Lewis and Frank Jackson. An important question that it raises concerns what to say once "it turns out that there is nothing of which the a priori theory is true."

There are those who say that the Canberra Plan could prove insufficient and inconsistent to effectively pick out a feature of or relationship in the world.

References

Bibliography
 David Braddon-Mitchell, Robert Nola, "Introducing the Canberra Plan", Conceptual Analysis and Philosophical Naturalism, MIT Press, 2008 

Philosophical methodology
Canberra